Gilles Perrault (born Jacques Peyroles; 9 March 1931) is a French writer and journalist.

Biography 
Born in Paris, Perrault attended the Collège Stanislas de Paris and then studied at the Institut d'études politiques, eventually becoming a lawyer, a profession he worked in for five years.

After the success of his essay Les parachutistes (1961), inspired by his military service in Algeria, he became a journalist and wrote articles about Nehru's India, the 1964 Summer Olympics in Tokyo and the problems of African Americans in the United States. He then investigated less well-known aspects of World War II.

Since 1961, he has lived in Sainte-Marie-du-Mont, Manche, upon which he wrote the book Les gens d'ici ("People from here")

Le Secret du jour J (1964) (Secrets of D-Day, 1974) won a prize from the Comité d'action de la Résistance and was an international bestseller. L'Orchestre rouge (1967) was even more successful. In 1969, Perrault published a spy novel, Le dossier 51. 

In 1978, Perrault published Le Pull-over rouge, a novel in which he criticized the method of investigation done by the French police around the 1974 death of an eight-year-old girl. Christian Ranucci, a French man, was executed by guillotine for the murder on 28 July 1976. Perrault's case, calling Ranucci's guilt into question, held a great influence in the debate upon capital punishment in France. It has reportedly had a notable impact upon a part of public opinion, having sold over 1 million copies. Perrault was condemned twice, however, for his claims and papers about this case: in 1989 for having talked in a TV program of "abuse of authority" about the policemen in charge of the investigation (fined 30,000 francs to each person defamed at first instance, 40,000 on appeal in 1990, then 70,000 francs to each of the five plaintiffs on cassation in 1992, as well as the presenter); and in 2008 he and his publisher Fayard were found guilty of defamation toward the Marseille police in the book L'Ombre de Christian Ranucci (fined 5,000 euros and his editor an equal sum, a decision confirmed on appeal in 2009 and granted 10,000 euros in damages to each of the four policemen defamed).

In 1980, he created the TV series Julien Fontanes, magistrat with Jean Cosmos.

In 1990, Perrault published Notre ami le roi (Our Friend the King, 1993) about the regime and human rights abuses of Hassan II, at the time king of Morocco, who had until then been reported positively because of his close relations with the Western world. Perrault's book Le Garçon aux yeux gris (2001) was adapted by André Téchiné for the film Les Égarés.

Bibliography 
 Les parachutistes, 1961
 Le Secret du Jour J, 1964 (English translation: Secrets of D-Day, Arthur Barker, 1965, and Little, Brown and Company, 1965)
 L'orchestre rouge, 1967
 Le dossier 51, 1969
 Le Pull-over rouge, 1978
 Les gens d'ici, 1981
 Un homme à part, 1984 (A Man Apart: the Life of Henri Curiel, 1987  (pbk.))
Paris under the occupation, Gilles Perrault, Jean-Pierre Azéma, Deutsch, 1989, 
 Notre ami le roi, 1990 (Our Friend the King, 1993 )
 Les jardins de l'Observatoire, 1995
 Le Livre noir du capitalisme, 1998
 Le garçon aux yeux gris, 2001
 Go!, 2002
 L'ombre de Christian Ranucci, 2006
 Checkpoint Charlie, 2008
 Dictionnaire amoureux de la Résistance, 2014
 Grand-père, 2016

References

External links 
 Biblioweb : biography, bibliography (in French)

1931 births
Living people
Writers from Paris
French journalists
Collège Stanislas de Paris alumni
French male non-fiction writers